Ranitomeya amazonica is a poison dart frog in the genus Ranitomeya. It was first described by Rainer Schulte in 1999 as Dendrobates amazonicus when he separated it from Dendrobates ventrimaculatus, primarily on the basis of call characteristics. The validity of the species has been debated, but further studies, also including genetic data, support its validity.

Distribution
Known distribution consists of widely separated populations, one in northeastern Amazonian Peru (Loreto Region, including the type locality) and extreme southeastern Colombia (Amazonas Department), and expected in the adjacent Brazil, Venezuela; extreme southern Guyana; eastern French Guiana; the mouth of the Amazon in Brazil. Whether the large gaps are real or result from insufficient sampling is unknown.

Conservation status
It is listed as "Data Deficient" on the IUCN Red List based on the assessment from 2004. The number of them in the wild is unknown. More recently, Brown, Twomey, and colleagues suggested that it should be classified as "Least Concern". The frog occurs in the Alpahuayo Mishana National Reserve in Peru.

Description
Ranitomeya amazonica is 16–19 mm long with smooth, black skin. The torso is laterally striped orange or red while the legs and arms feature a mesh of blue, grey or green on black. There is no explicit sexual dimorphism in this frog, but females tend to be slightly bigger than males.

Habitat
Its habitat is in the Amazon Rainforest. It most frequently uses bromeliads for breeding.

References

External links

New species discovered in Amazon Yahoo News.

Amphibians described in 1999
Ranitomeya
Amphibians of Brazil
Amphibians of Colombia
Amphibians of French Guiana
Amphibians of Guyana
Amphibians of Peru